The Dubois County Railroad  is a Class III short-line railroad serving Dubois County in southern Indiana, United States, and is a for-profit subsidiary of the Indiana Railway Museum, now better known as the French Lick Scenic Railway.

The railroad branches off a Norfolk Southern line in Huntingburg and heads north to the county seat of Jasper. Beyond Jasper, the tracks are owned and operated by the Indiana Railway Museum as a heritage railroad.

Freight hauled on the line consists mainly of petroleum products.  The Railroad also operates tourist service for the Spirit of Jasper

External links

Dubois County Railroad (archive)
Dubois County Railroad

Indiana railroads
Southwestern Indiana
Transportation in Dubois County, Indiana